The 2018 Inter-County Under 20 Football Championship was the 55th edition of the competition, and the first since the competition was re-graded from Under 21 to Under 20. It was sponsored by Eirgrid, and known as the EirGrid GAA Football U20 All-Ireland Championship for sponsorship purposes. 31 counties played in the tournament (Kilkenny did not participate). The competition began with a preliminary round game in Ulster on 25 May 2018, and ended with the final on 5 August 2018.

Competition format

Player eligibility

Players under 20 years of age cannot play for a county's senior and under-20 championship teams. This rule was introduced to prevent player burnout and to allow the senior and under-20 championships to be scheduled in the same summer months with separate panels of players. If an under-20 player plays for a county's senior championship team, he is ineligible to play for their under-20 team.

This rule results in some county under-20 county teams playing without their best under-20 footballers. For example, Sean O'Shea and David Clifford played for the Kerry senior championship team in 2018 and therefore were not allowed to play for the Kerry under-20 team which meant that the under-20 team was weakened.

Provincial Championships format

Connacht, Leinster, Munster and Ulster each organise a provincial championship. Each province decides the format for their championship – the format can be straight knockout, double-elimination, a league, groups, etc. or a combination.

All-Ireland format

The four provincial winners meet in two semi-finals, with the winners of those matches playing in the All-Ireland Under-20 Football Championship Final.

Provincial championships

Connacht Championship

Connacht Quarter-Finals

Connacht Semi-Finals

Connacht Final

Leinster Championship

Group stage

Group 1

Round 1

Round 2

 
Round 3

Group 2

Round 1

Round 2

 
Round 3

Group 3

Round 1

Round 2

 
Round 3

Knockout stage

Leinster Quarter-Finals

Leinster Semi-Finals

Leinster Final

Munster Championship

Munster Quarter-Finals

Munster Semi-Finals

Munster Final

Ulster Championship

The Ulster championship is organised on a random draw. All matches are straight knockout. The winners receive the Danny Murphy Cup which was commissioned in 2018 in honour of the former Ulster Chief Executive Officer and Secretary.

Ulster Preliminary Round

Ulster Quarter-Finals

Ulster Semi-Finals

Ulster Final

All-Ireland

Semi-finals

Final

References

All-Ireland Under 20 Football Championship
All-Ireland Under-20 Football Championships